Raffles City stands for several skyscraper buildings:

 Raffles City Bahrain
 Raffles City Beijing
 Raffles City Chengdu
 Raffles City Chongqing
 Raffles City Hangzhou
 Raffles City Shanghai
 Raffles City Singapore